Drama Football Clubs Association, Greek: Ένωση Ποδοσφαιρικών Σωματείων Δράμας, ΕΠΣΔ Enosi Podosfairikon Somateion Dramas, EPSD), is representing teams from the Greek regional unit of Drama. Is also a member of Hellenic Football Federation.

Divisions
EPSD teams are split in four divisions.

A1 EPSD
A2 EPSD
Beta EPSD
Gamma EPSD

Notes

External links

Association football governing bodies in Greece